Isabella India Jane Laughland (born 1991) is a British actress. She began her career in the Harry Potter films Half Blood Prince (2009) and Deathly Hallows: Part 1 (2010) and Part 2 (2011). She went on to star in Urban Hymn (2015) and Chubby Funny (2016). Her other films include Now Is Good (2012), Slaughterhouse Rulez (2018), Film Stars Don't Die in Liverpool (2017), and Good Luck to You, Leo Grande (2022).

On television, she is known for her roles in the Black Mirror episode "Fifteen Million Merits" (2011), the BBC Two comedy-drama Trigonometry (2020), and the Channel 5 miniseries Anne Boleyn (2021). She also had recurring roles in the Channel 4 drama Chimerica (2019), the BBC One sitcom Ghosts (2019) and drama Four Lives (2022), and a voice role in The Dark Crystal: Age of Resistance (2019) on Netflix.

Laughland is a regular performer on stage, starring in the National Theatre productions of Greenland (2011) and The Last of the Haussmans (2012). In 2010, she was nominated for Outstanding Newcomer at the Evening Standard Theatre Awards for her performance in Wanderlust at the Royal Court Theatre.

Early life and education 
Laughland was born in 1991 in West London to Welsh television director Nick Laughland (1951–2020) and casting director Nadira Seecoomar, who is of Indo-Guyanese heritage. Seecoomar's father had arrived in England from Guyana in 1962 as part of the Windrush generation. Laughland was raised in Twickenham, South West London with her older brother Oliver, now a reporter for The Guardian.

As a teenager, Laughland participated in a drama group hosted each Saturday by the Young Blood Theatre Company at the Riverside Studios, Hammersmith. However, her mother insisted that she take her GCSEs before going into acting.  Laughland further developed her acting skills through the National Youth Theatre.

Career
Laughland made her television debut in a 2008 episode of the E4 sitcom The Inbetweeners. She was 16 when she was cast as Leanne in Harry Potter and the Half-Blood Prince, marking her feature film debut in 2009. She would reprise her role in the final two Harry Potter films Harry Potter and the Deathly Hallows: Part 1 (2010) and Part 2 (2011). 

Also in 2010, Laughland made her professional stage debut in Nick Payne's Wanderlust at the Royal Court Theatre, for which she was nominated for Outstanding Newcomer at the Evening Standard Theatre Awards. She then appeared in the Black Mirror episode "Fifteen Million Merits" on Channel 4 and the teeb film Now Is Good, and starred in the National Theatre productions of Greenland and The Last of the Haussmans.

Laughland starred in the 2015 and 2016 films Urban Hymn and Chubby Funny. For her performance in the former, Laughland was longlisted for the British Independent Film Award for Most Promising Newcomer. She led Pride and Prejudice opposite James Northcote at the Sheffield Crucible. In 2017, she played Vanessa in the film Film Stars Don't Die in Liverpool in a cast which included Annette Bening, Julie Walters, Stephen Graham, and Vanessa Redgrave.

In 2021, Laughland starred in the Channel 5 Tudor thriller Anne Boleyn as “Lizzie” (Elizabeth Browne, Countess of Worcester), lady-in-waiting to Anne Boleyn.

In 2022, she played the role of China in the BBC One four-part true crime drama Four Lives alongside Stephen Merchant and Sheridan Smith.

Personal life
Laughland has said she dislikes watching herself on screen, but does so to analyse her performance, and regards her acting career as a marathon rather than a sprint.

Filmography

Film

Television

Stage

Awards and nominations

References

External links 
 
 Isabella Laughland at Curtis Brown
 Isabella Laughland at Loud and Clear Voices
 

Living people
21st-century English actresses
English voice actresses
English film actresses
English people of Indo-Guyanese descent
English people of Welsh descent
English stage actresses
English television actresses
National Youth Theatre members
People from Twickenham
Year of birth uncertain